Bis in die Spitzen (To The Tips) is a German drama television series, based on the British BBC series Cutting It. The series was originally broadcast on Mondays at 21:15, with 13 episodes in total being broadcast on Sat. 1. The original run of the series started on 10 October 2005 and the final episode was broadcast on 9 January 2006.

Plot

Niki and Philipp have been happily married for ten years and run a hairdressing salon together in Berlin. But their life of tranquility does not last long, as Niki's ex-boyfriend Finn appears and sends Niki into an emotional rollercoaster. Finn's wife Mia also decides to open a salon directly across the street and causes a turf war, which is fought on all fronts.

Reviews and Production

Prior to release the series was highly anticipated and praised by critics, but the ratings fell short of expectations. Following poor reviews Sat. 1 announced on 27 December 2005 that the series would be discontinued after the first season (13 episodes); a continuation of the series had originally been planned.

The complete series was first released on DVD on 24 March 2006 as a set of four discs.

See also
List of German television series

External links
 
 RPreporting about the series cancellation
 Bis in die Spitzen on sat1.de

German drama television series
2005 German television series debuts
2005 German television series endings
Sat.1 original programming
German-language television shows